A Little Prayer is a 2023 drama film directed, written and produced by Angus MacLachlan. It stars David Strathairn, Jane Levy, Celia Weston, Will Pullen, Anna Camp and Dascha Polanco.

Cast
David Strathairn as Bill, David's father
Jane Levy as Tammy, David's wife
Celia Weston as Venida, David's mother
Will Pullen as David, Tammy's husband
Anna Camp
Dascha Polanco

Production
MacLachlan revealed to Vulture that the development of the film had started six years prior. The principal photography took place in June 2022 in MacLachlan's hometown of Winston-Salem, North Carolina.

Release
The film had its world premiere at the 2023 Sundance Film Festival on January 24, 2023. Shortly after, Sony Pictures Classics acquired its world distribution rights.

Reception

References

External links

2023 drama films
2020s English-language films
Adultery in films
Sony Pictures Classics films
Films about abortion
Films about post-traumatic stress disorder
Films shot in North Carolina